Somewhere is a 2010 drama film written and directed by Sofia Coppola. The film follows Johnny Marco (played by Stephen Dorff), a newly famous actor, as he recuperates from a minor injury at the Chateau Marmont, a well-known Hollywood retreat. Despite money, fame and professional success, Marco is trapped in an existential crisis and has an emotionally empty daily life. When his ex-wife suffers an unexplained breakdown and goes away, she leaves Cleo (Elle Fanning), their 11-year-old daughter, in his care. They spend time together and her presence helps Marco mature and accept adult responsibility. The film explores ennui among Hollywood stars, the father–daughter relationship and offers an oblique comedy of show business, particularly Hollywood film-making and the life of a "star".

Somewhere premiered at the 67th Venice International Film Festival where it received the Golden Lion award for best picture. Critical opinion was generally positive. Critics praised the patience of the film's visual style and its empathy for a handful of characters, but some felt that Somewhere repeated themes in Coppola's previous work or that its protagonist was less than sympathetic. It was released to theaters in the United Kingdom and Ireland on December 10, 2010, and in the United States on December 22, 2010.

Plot
As the film opens a black Ferrari circles on a race track in the desert, roaring in and out of the shot. When it eventually stops, Johnny Marco steps out. Marco is a recently divorced Hollywood actor who, despite his rise to fame, does not feel much meaning in his daily life. He resides at the Chateau Marmont in Los Angeles, where he is nursing a broken wrist in a plaster arm cast. Despite drinking and socializing occasionally with Sammy, a fellow actor and childhood friend, Marco spends much of his time alone, driving his car, drinking beer and taking pills, watching a pair of pole-dancing twins perform in his rooms, and having casual sex with various women and aspiring starlets. He receives an unexpected visit from his 11-year-old daughter Cleo.

Johnny completes various publicity obligations for his new film: he is photographed with his contemptuous co-star and gives an interview to the press. Cleo's stay changes his lifestyle little at first. They spend time together in his room and he brings her with him on a publicity trip to Milan, where they stay in a lavish hotel suite and he has a blonde woman as an overnight guest. He is awarded with a "Telegatto" on a television show in which local celebrities play themselves. He helps Cleo prepare for summer camp, takes her on a gambling trip to Las Vegas, and hires a helicopter to drop her off at the camp. After their time together, Johnny's fatherly emotions emerge and force him to re-assess his otherwise "successful" life. He calls his ex-wife and tearfully breaks down, admitting to his inadequacies and unhappiness. His ex-wife seems indifferent and declines his request to come see him. Johnny checks out of the hotel, promising not to return, and drives his Ferrari into the countryside. Eventually, he stops by the roadside and gets out, leaving behind his Ferrari and walking down the highway with a faint smile on his face.

Cast
 Stephen Dorff as Johnny Marco
 Elle Fanning as Cleo
 Chris Pontius as Sammy, a fellow actor and childhood friend of Johnny
 Michelle Monaghan as actress playing co-star to Johnny
 Kristina and Karissa Shannon as pole-dancing twins

Production

Scenes from the film are said to be inspired by the director's childhood experiences as the daughter of Francis Ford Coppola. She recalls sampling all the gelato flavors on a Milanese hotel's room service menu, a trip to Italy, a helicopter ride, and though she said there was a "personal connection" to the film, she denied it was an autobiography. Rather, she based the character of Cleo on a friend's daughter whose parents work in Hollywood and used her own experiences to relate to the character and add a realistic touch. Federico Fellini's Toby Dammit (1968) has also been noted as an influence. Meanwhile, the parental focus of the film developed because Coppola had recently had her second child. Coppola said that she thought of Dorff to play Marco early while writing the film, because he had an aura of "the bad-boy actor," but also "this really sweet, sincere side."

Coppola wanted a minimalist look for the film, especially after the mixed reactions to her richly costumed Marie Antoinette. The overall effect was to be "sweet and genuine but without being sappy." For the visual style she discussed Bruce Weber's Hollywood portraits and Helmut Newton's photographs of models at the Chateau Marmont, and Jeanne Dielman, 23 quai du Commerce, 1080 Bruxelles (1975), a film by Chantal Akerman about the routine of a Belgian housewife, with Harris Savides, the cinematographer. He said, "The main thing was to tell the story really simply and let it play out in long beats and have the audience discover the moment." Coppola used the lenses that her father had used to film Rumble Fish (1983) in an effort to give the film a more period look, although it is set in the present.

Before filming began Dorff, Fanning, and Lala Sloatman (who plays Marco's ex-wife) improvised meals and fights to understand the family's dynamic. Dorff also collected Fanning from school and they spent an afternoon together to bond. Dorff stayed in the Chateau Marmont during principal photography, making it easier to get to the set and understand the character. Coppola also showed Dorff Paper Moon (1973) during production.

Cinematography
Filming took place in Los Angeles and Italy in June and July 2009. Benicio del Toro, Erin Wasson and members of the band Rooney have cameos in the film. In a feature for The New York Times website, Coppola discussed making the scene when Marco visits a special effects studio. She said she initially was unsure of how to approach it, but Savides did a long, slow zoom which captures his breathing and creates a sense of claustrophobia. Despite many takes, Dorff was a "good sport", she said. The sound of the phone ringing was added by Sarah Flack, the editor, to indicate that Marco has been forgotten.

Soundtrack
Phoenix, a French rock band, contributed the film's score. Coppola is married to Thomas Mars, the band's singer; she liked the songs "Love Like a Sunset Part I" and "Love Like a Sunset Part II" and requested the band do similar music for the film.
In 2010 the film score for Somewhere was announced, but remains unreleased. Except for The Strokes song during the poolside scene, the score is diegetic. For example, Cleo ice-skates to Gwen Stefani, and the twins pole-dance to the Foo Fighters.

Track listing
"Love Like a Sunset Part I" – Phoenix
"Gandhi Fix" – William Storkson
"My Hero" – Foo Fighters
"So Lonely" – The Police
"1 Thing" – Amerie
"20th Century Boy" – T. Rex
"Cool" – Gwen Stefani
"Che si fa" – Paolo Jannacci
"Teddy Bear" – Romulo
"Love Theme From Kiss" – Kiss
"I'll Try Anything Once" – Julian Casablancas
"Look" – Sebastien Tellier
"Smoke Gets In Your Eyes" – Bryan Ferry
"Massage Music" – William Storkson
"Love Like a Sunset Part II" – Phoenix

Release
Somewhere premiered at the 67th Venice International Film Festival on September 3, 2010, and it was released in Italy on the same day. At the festival's close (September 11), the jury unanimously awarded Somewhere the Golden Lion, the festival's prize for the best overall film. Quentin Tarantino, president of the jury, said the film "grew and grew in our hearts, in our minds, in our affections" after the first screening. Focus Features distributed Somewhere in North America and most other territories. Pathé released the film in France on January 5, 2011, while Tohokushinsha distributed it in Japan. Medusa Film has rights in Italy. Somewhere was released on December 10, 2010 in both Ireland and the United Kingdom, and on December 22 in North America.

In its debut weekend in the United States, the film opened in seven theaters with $119,086, averaging $17,012 per cinema. , it has grossed $1,785,645 in the United States and US$13,936,909 worldwide. In the United Kingdom, Somewhere went on limited release to 62 cinemas. It earned £126,000 in the first weekend, of December 10, 2010. Its average per screen, £2,026, was higher than Coppola's earlier small film openings, Marie Antoinette (2006) and The Virgin Suicides (1999). However, it was a lesser total taking. In France, Somewhere earned  in the three weeks to January 25, 2011.

Reception
Somewhere received positive reviews. The film holds a 70% approval rating on Rotten Tomatoes, based on 196 reviews with an average score of 6.6/10. The critical consensus states: "It covers familiar territory for Sofia Coppola, but Somewhere remains a hypnotic, seductively pensive meditation on the nature of celebrity, anchored by charming performances from Stephen Dorff and Elle Fanning". The film also has a score of 67 out of 100 on Metacritic based on 40 reviews. In 2019, Somewhere was included in Richard Brody's list of the 27 best films of the decade.

Sight & Sound magazine, published by the British Film Institute, described Somewhere as "going round in circles" and noted that many viewers would "write off Coppola's film as the whining of the privileged", but also acknowledged "a delicate portrait of a still-maturing pre-teen daughter". During the 2010 National Board of Review Awards, Sofia Coppola was given the Special Filmmaking Achievement Award for writing, directing and producing Somewhere.

Roger Ebert, writing in the Chicago Sun-Times, awarded the film four out of four stars and praised the detail in the portrait of Johnny Marco, saying "Coppola is a fascinating director. She sees, and we see exactly what she sees. There is little attempt here to observe a plot. All the attention is on the handful of characters, on Johnny." A.O. Scott in The New York Times called the film "exquisite, melancholy and formally audacious" and said "This is not a matter of imitation, but rather of mastery, of finding — by borrowing if necessary — a visual vocabulary suited to the story and its environment. If you pay close attention, "Somewhere" will show you everything." Peter Bradshaw disagreed in The Guardian, awarding the film two stars from five. He praised the cinematic technique but said that the film resembled Lost in Translation too closely, lacked emotional depth and that even on second viewing "the question of why we should really care or be interested remains tantalisingly unanswered"; the final shot failed to solve any emotional problems and "really is one of the daftest things I have seen for a long time."

Allociné, a French cinema website, calculated a score of 2.9 stars out of 5 from twenty-six press reviews. French newspaper Le Monde gave the film a positive review, saying Somewhere was Coppola's most minimalist and daring film. Coppola's films, it said, deal with "the delicate irony of the delinquency of a universe of the happy few", which is both to her credit and a ghost which haunts her, a loyalty ensnaring her. France 24 said the "virtuosity of Coppola is also in her keeping empathy for the characters without pouring out mushy sentiment." Richard Roeper listed Somewhere as one of the top ten films of 2010.

Interpretation

Celebrity ennui
Coppola's first three films examine feminine self-definition and maturation, usually in privileged circumstance. Lost in Translation (2003) depicts an encounter and brief friendship between two lonely Americans in a luxurious Tokyo hotel; Marie Antoinette (2006), a stylized biopic of the eponymous queen, examined her loneliness. Somewhere examines similar themes of success and isolation, but from a male perspective. The film explores Marco's seclusion and depression despite his outward professional success and the resulting wealth and fame. He appears to suffer from anhedonia, the inability to feel pleasure, but the film itself is reticent in suggesting its causes. "He believes he's nothing", summarized film critic Roger Ebert, "and it appears he's correct". The film's opening shot, a Ferrari circling a race-track in and out of a stationary camera position, its whine and roar rising and falling, establishes the theme of ennui. The sequence's length also offers a visual cue from Coppola to relax, observe and withhold expectations. Coppola said she wanted to hint at this with a simple camera set-up, "so you're alone with this guy and not aware that it's a movie. But I hope it's a welcome contrast to the style of most movies out there. Something that gives you a chance to take a breath".

The Chateau Marmont, a well-known retreat for Hollywood celebrities, is the film's setting and can be "either a paradise of easy wish-fulfillment or a purgatory of celebrity anomie" (A.O. Scott), but Coppola subtly conveys the emptiness of Marco's situation without denying its appeal. Coppola has stayed at the hotel, and said "I've seen a few Johnny Marcos"; in contrast, writing the part of the daughter, she drew on childhood experiences with her director father, Francis Ford Coppola, such as attending film festivals, though she denied the film was autobiographical. Coppola said that cultural depictions of fame are unbalanced, and at a time when so many strive for it she is trying to show a different side of it.

Parenthood
Coppola mentioned that the parental angle was inspired by the birth of her second child. As the film progresses the "tender and temporary" father–daughter relationship comes to the fore. Marco has partial custody of his daughter from a failed marriage. Ebert speculates that she probably understands the reasons for the split better than he, and wonders why the child must suffer his hedonism and "detached attempts at fatherhood". In some ways Cleo—having grown up inside the Hollywood bubble—mothers her father, cooking for him and being more worldly aware, but she also watches him with the wide-eyed adoration of a child.

Comedy of show-business
Coppola comes from a family of film-makers and actors, and she has said how childhood memories of living in hotels partially inspired her choice of setting. Somewhere presents a detailed portrait of life in that industry and charts its existential and emotional boundaries. While celebrity gossip websites inform us of the shallowness of much of "star life", Coppola's feature differs in its emotional depth. She wanted to depict Marco working, but not on a film set. Instead he is shown giving interviews, being photographed, attending an awards ceremony in Italy, and having special effects make-up applied. When Marco attends the special-effects department his face is covered in latex, the camera then very slowly, hypnotically zooms in. Marco is obliged to use his "star" recognition to help promote his new film, when his publicist calls he becomes passive and mechanically takes the arranged chauffeured car and speaks to the press. In part, the humor derives from Marco's subdued response to these attentions, and Coppola's off-beat observation of people around him. At the Venice film festival, critics highlighted the repetition of characters in a cloistered existence in Coppola's films, to which she responded "I feel like everyone should tell what they know in the world that they know".

Legacy
In 2019, Somewhere was included in Richard Brody's list of the 27 best films of the decade.

References

External links

 
 
 
 Somewhere at The Numbers
 

2010 comedy-drama films
American comedy-drama films
American Zoetrope films
Films about actors
Films directed by Sofia Coppola
Films set in hotels
Films shot in Italy
Films shot in Los Angeles
Focus Features films
American independent films
Golden Lion winners
Films with screenplays by Sofia Coppola
2010 independent films
2010 films
Films about father–daughter relationships
2010s English-language films
2010s American films
Films scored by musical groups